Qatar Amiri Flight is a VIP airline owned and operated by the government of Qatar. It operates worldwide charters on demand and caters exclusively to the royal family of Qatar and other VIP government staff. The vast majority of its fleet is painted in the standard livery of the commercial flag carrier of Qatar, Qatar Airways.

Fleet
The Qatar Amiri Flight fleet comprises the following aircraft (as of ):

Previously operated aircraft

Though not part of Amiri fleet, a Boeing 747SP and 747-8i were operated for Qatar's former ruler till 2016 and sold in 2018, both were registered in the Caribbean.

The 747SP was an ex-Pan American World Airways N539PA (1979-1986) / ex-United Airlines N148UA (1986-1995) registered as VR-BAT then as VP-BAT, stored at John C. Munro International Airport until late 2019 then flown to Pinal Airpark in Marana, Arizona as N7477S to perform C Check for new owner CSDS Asset Management.
While Qatar's emir gifted the Boeing 747-8 private jet to Turkey in September 2018.

The 747-8i was also the first aircraft of the model type to be delivered by Boeing to a customer.

References

External links

 

Airlines of Qatar
Airlines established in 1977
Charter airlines
Government-owned airlines
Companies based in Doha
Qatari companies established in 1977